Tejumade Alakija (17 May 1925 – August, 2013) was a Nigerian civil servant who rose to be the first female head of Oyo State's civil service.

Life
Princess Alakija Tejumade was born on the 17, May 1925 in Ile-Ife, Oyo State, South-westhern part of  Nigeria. Alakija Tejumade want to  Aiyetoro Primary and Central Schools, Ile-Ife. Her father was Sir Adesoji Aderemi, who was the Ooni of Ife. She trained to be a teacher and passed her PGCE at Oxford University in 1950 to 1951. She joined the Nigerian civil service where she was directed to teach.

As a Teacher She started her teaching career at  Queen’s School, Ede, Osun State, and later transferred to the new Government Girls’ Secondary Grammar School from 1951 to 1953. During her career as a teacher, she founded a school named  Girls' Secondary Grammar School in 1953. She also worked at the Ministry of Works and Ministry of Trade and Industries as the Assistant Secretary and was appointed as Training Officer-in Charge of the region’s Public Service Training Programme and secretary of some  important commissions. Respectively from 1960 to 1964, and later, she became Chief Investment Officer in the Ministry of Trade and Industries in charge of Industrial Promotions from 1969  to 1972.

Alakija Tejumade also served in some key ministries, such as Ministry of Health as the Deputy Permanent Secretary in 1978, and also in Ministry of Education as Permanent Secretary in 1979, before becoming the head of state civil service in Oyo State.

She rose to be the first female head of Oyo State's civil service. From 1993 to 1997, she was Pro-Chancellor of the University of Abuja.

Princess Alakija died in University College Hospital, Ibadan in 2013.

References

1925 births
2013 deaths
Nigerian civil servants
Women educators
Nigerian women academics
Alumni of the University of Oxford
University of Abuja people
Women civil servants
20th-century Nigerian politicians
Oyo State politicians
Yoruba women educators
Yoruba women in politics
Nigerian schoolteachers
History of women in Nigeria
Yoruba princesses
20th-century Nigerian women politicians
Nigerian princesses
St Anne's School, Ibadan alumni
People from Oyo State
Yoruba people